"Put You Up on Game" is a duet by American singers Aretha Franklin and Fantasia Barrino. It was written by Harvey Mason Jr., Damon Thomas, Steve Russell, Antonio Dixon, Kaleena Harper, and Larry Jackson for Franklin's 2007 compilation album Jewels in the Crown: All-Star Duets with the Queen, with production helmed by The Underdogs. The song peaked at number ten on the Adult R&B Songs and earned the pair a NAACP Image Award nomination in the Outstanding Duo or Group category.

Charts

References

Aretha Franklin songs
2007 singles
Fantasia Barrino songs
Female vocal duets
Songs written by Kalenna Harper
2007 songs
Songs written by Antonio Dixon (songwriter)
Songs written by Harvey Mason Jr.
Songs written by Damon Thomas (record producer)
Song recordings produced by the Underdogs (production team)